Ulmus × hollandica 'Pitteurs' or 'Pitteursii', one of a number of hybrid cultivars arising from the crossing of the Wych Elm Ulmus glabra with a variety of Field Elm Ulmus minor, was first identified by Morren as l'orme Pitteurs (1848). Elwes and Henry (1913) and  Krüssmann (1976) listed it as an Ulmus × hollandica cultivar. It was named after the landowner Henri Bonaventure Trudon de Pitteurs of Saint-Trond, near Liège, Belgium, who discovered and first propagated the tree on his estate.

Description
'Pitteurs' was a tall tree, chiefly distinguished by its large, rounded, convex leaves, < 20 cm long  by < 19 cm broad, a little attenuate at the apex and with prominent venation. Kirchner and Petzold, describing a tree by that name from the Royal State Tree Nursery at Sanssouci, noted (1864) that the slightly glossy dark green leaves were obtuse-toothed, and appeared reddish-brown when they unfolded. Aigret, however, reported (1905) that the specimen in the Jardin Botanique de Liège, planted in Morren's time, did not match Morren's description, having leaves of ordinary U. montana [used both for wych and for Ulmus × hollandica] dimensions, and being more elongated and acuminate than those described. This suggests that Morren's measurements for 'Pitteurs', like his measurements for 'Superba', may have been based on the largest of long-shoot leaves.

Cultivation
Reputedly one of two varieties grown from seed obtained in 1845 by Henri de Pitteurs of Sint-Truiden or Saint-Trond, near Liège, Belgium, the tree was planted on his estate and along roadsides in the region. Gillekens noted in 1891 that in the areas of Liège and Limbourg, 'Pitteurs' was preferred to 'Belgica'. Augustine Henry (1912) thought the tree, which produced shoots growing almost one metre a year, probably identical with those called orme Saint-Trond he saw at Looymans' nursery at Oudenbosch, which he considered perhaps identical when young to a variety of Ulmus montana occasionally sold as var. macrophylla. An elm said to be similar and also cultivated on the Pitteurs estate was 'Folia Rhomboidea'.

'Pitteurs' was distributed as Ulmus campestris Pittersii by the Baudriller nursery, Angers. The Späth nursery of Berlin sold an elm which they said went by the name of 'Pitteurs' in some nurseries but which they themselves called U. hollandica. They continued to distribute it till the late 1930s. A specimen stood in Cantons Park, Baarn, in the interwar period.  The Hesse nursery of Weener, Germany, marketed 'Pitteurs' in the 1930s as Ulmus latifolia, adding " = U. hollandica or U. pitteursi ", and in the 1950s as U. hollandica pitteursi. 

The Ulmus gras introduced to the USA c.1871, "a fine pyramidal-growing variety", distinguished in catalogues from 'Belgica', may have been Orme gras ('Pitteurs'). It was later renamed Ulmus montana grassei by some nurseries. 'Pitteurs' was present in the Arnold Arboretum, Massachusetts, in the interwar years.

In 1998 an unsuccessful search of the de Pitteurs-Hiegaerts Estate (now in the public domain and known as the Speelhof park) was mounted in an attempt to rediscover the elm. It is assumed the cultivar fell victim to Dutch elm disease, as did thousands of other elms in the same district. However, 'Pitteurs' was known to have been marketed (as U. montana 'Pitteursi') in Poland in the 19th century by the Ulrich nursery, Warsaw, and so may still survive in Eastern Europe. Several trees were thought to survive in England, in the Brighton area. 'Pitteurs' is not known to have been introduced to North America or Australasia.

Putative specimens 
A pruned U. × hollandica with large, rounded, convex leaves, and obtuse teeth, exactly matching Morren's 1848 leaf-drawing of 'Pitteurs', stands in Portland Road, Hove (2016). 
 
A second tree, also pruned, in Hove Recreation Ground, has leaves matching a Royal Botanic Garden Edinburgh 1903 'Pitteurs' herbarium specimen. 

A putative specimen in the Extra Mural Cemetery in Brighton, was blown down in the Great Storm of 1987 (see gallery).

Accessions
None known.

Hybrid cultivars
'Pitteurs' was crossed with other Ulmus × hollandica in the Dutch elm breeding programme before World War II, but none of the progeny were retained.

Synonymy
 l'Orme gras
?l'Orme St. Trond
Ulmus campestris latifolia, foliis rotundata: Morren, Journal d'agriculture pratique 4: 509, 511, 1851.
Ulmus campestris var pitteursii: Wesmael in Bulletin de la Fédération des sociétés d'horticulture de Belgique 1862: 382, 1863.
Ulmus scabra macrophylla Hort.: Dieck, (Zöschen, Germany), Haupt-catalog der Obst- und gehölzbaumschulen des ritterguts Zöschen bei Merseburg 1885 p. 82.

References

External links
 Long shoots. Sheet described as U. montana With. f. hollandica Hort. = Pitteursii Ch. Morren
 Short shoots. Sheet described as U. hollandica pitteursii / U. hollandica Mill. var. pitteursii Rehder
 Sheet described as Ulmus montana With. f. hollandica Hort. = Pitteursii Ch. Morren, 1903
"Herbarium specimen BR0000027730775V". Botanic Garden, Meise. Sheet labelled Umus pitteursii, Liège botanical garden specimen (1904)
 Sheet described as U. Pitteursii gigantea, renamed U. hollandica Mill. var. pitteursii Rehder
 Sheet labelled Ulmus pitteursii Ch. Morren, Baarn, 1931; twig and flowers

Dutch elm cultivar
Ulmus articles with images
Ulmus